The 1941 Tulsa Golden Hurricane team represented the University of Tulsa during the 1941 college football season. In their first year under head coach Henry Frnka, the Golden Hurricane compiled an 8–2 record (4–0 against conference opponents), won the Missouri Valley Conference championship, and defeated Texas Tech, 6–0, in the 1942 Sun Bowl.

The team was led by brothers Glenn Dobbs and Bobby Dobbs. Glenn was later inducted into the College Football Hall of Fame; Bobby served as Tulsa's head coach from 1955 to 1960.

Six Tulsa players were selected by the conference coaches as first-team players on the 1941 All-Missouri Valley Conference football team: halfbacks Glenn Dobbs and N.A. Keithley; end Elston Campbell and Saxon Judd; center Richard Morgan; and tackle Charles Greene. Four others were named to the second team: quarterback Joe Gibson; guard Roy Stuart and Wayne Holt; and tackle Jim Worthington.

Schedule

References

Tulsa
Tulsa Golden Hurricane football seasons
Missouri Valley Conference football champion seasons
Sun Bowl champion seasons
Tulsa Golden Hurricane football